Tseko Monaheng, is a Mosotho actor. He is best known for the roles in the films This Is Not a Burial, It's a Resurrection, Five Fingers for Marseilles and short film Behemoth: Or the Game of God.

Career
In 2005, Monaheng was discovered by veteran actor and producer, Silas Monyatsi during the auditions for AIDS drama Ke Khetho Eaka. Later in the same year, he acted in the short film Untitled directed by Kaizer Matsumunyane. In the meantime, he acted in several AIDS radio dramas. In 2006 he debut in the South African drama along with Soul City’s Untitled Stories including Mapule's Choice and Monna Motsamai.

He also acted in several Mosotho films including Lemohang Jeremiah Mosese's critically acclaimed short film Behemoth: Or the Game of God as the lead role 'Preacher'. With the success of the short, he was then selected for Mosese's next venture This Is Not a Burial, It's a Resurrection in 2019. The film was screened at several international film festivals as well. He also acted in the local films: Kau la poho (2008) and Lilaphalapha.

In 2017, Monaheng acted in the South African film Five Fingers for Marseilles. He played the role as a corrupt police officer. The film received positive reviews and selected for screening at the Toronto International Film Festival (TIFF) from 7 to 17 September 2017. In 2018, he debut in the South African television with the soap opera Rhythm City. However, he was auditioned for the role in October 2017. Monaheng also joined with the productions: Mantsopa and Qomatsi as well as various 'Lesedi' FM radio dramas.

Filmography

References

External links
 

Living people
Sotho people
South African male film actors
Year of birth missing (living people)